The Awkward Stage was a Canadian indie pop band from Vancouver fronted by singer-songwriter Shane Nelken. The band's supporting lineup consisted of Tygh Runyan on lead guitar, Tony Koelwyn on drums and Chris Mitchell on trumpet and keyboards.

History
Nelken, who works as a cremationist, had a longtime side career as a musician, supporting a number of artists including A. C. Newman, New Pornographers and Sparrow. He put together The Awkward Stage (which included drummer Kurt Dahle), and released a debut album, Heaven Is for Easy Girls, on Mint Records in 2006. Nelken performed much of the music himself, with some help from violinist Kim Koch and trumpeter Shaun Brodie. The album charted on Canadian campus radio and CBC Radio 3, which named the band's song "We're Going for a Ride" one of its Top 94 songs of 2006.

With Tygh Runyan, Tony Koelwyn and Chris Mitchell, The Awkward Stage released a second album, Slimming Mirrors, Flattering Lights, in 2008.  The songs were written and arranged by Nelkin.

The band has been inactive since 2009.

Discography
 Heaven Is for Easy Girls (2006), Mint Records
 Slimming Mirrors, Flattering Lights (2008), Mint Records

References

External links
 The Awkward Stage official site
 The Awkward Stage profile at Mint Records
 Interview with Shane Nelken, October 8, 2008.

Musical groups established in 2006
Musical groups from Vancouver
Canadian indie pop groups
Mint Records artists
2006 establishments in British Columbia